This is a list of members of the Queensland Legislative Council from 1 January 1880 to 31 December 1889. Appointments, made by the Governor of Queensland, were for life, although many members for one reason or another resigned.

The chamber grew in size from 30 to 38 members during the course of the decade.

Office bearers

President of the Legislative Council:
 Joshua Peter Bell (3 April 1879 – 20 December 1881)
 Arthur Hunter Palmer (24 December 1881 – 20 March 1898)

Chairman of Committees:
 Daniel Foley Roberts (30 May 1860 – 26 July 1889)
 Thomas Lodge Murray-Prior (31 July 1889 – 31 December 1892)

Members

 James Taylor resigned from the Council on 10 January 1881 but was reappointed on 1 July 1881.
 James Garrick was previously a member of the Legislative Council from 13 November 1869 until 8 December 1870.

References

 Waterson, Duncan Bruce: Biographical Register of the Queensland Parliament 1860-1929 (second edition), Sydney 2001.
 Alphabetical Register of Members (Queensland Parliament)

Members of Queensland parliaments by term
19th-century Australian politicians